Eleven Sports is a Portuguese sports-oriented premium cable, satellite and IPTV television network with six premium channels and an OTT service. It is owned by Andrea Radrizzani (executive of the sports marketing MP & Silva) and The Channel Company. The operator opened its doors in Portugal in 2018 with the purchase of Champions League and Spanish League rights.

History 

In May 2018, Eleven Sports announced the purchase of the rights of the UEFA Champions League and LaLiga Santander for the Portuguese market. On the same month, Eleven announced a distribution partner with Portuguese telco Nowo.

In June 2018 it was announced the purchase of the rights to three French football league competitions: Ligue 1, Coupe de la Ligue and Trophée des Champions. On June 19, 2018, Eleven announced that it had purchased the rights to broadcast the Scottish Premiership, Belgian Pro League (starting in 2018-19 season) and Bundesliga (starting only on the 2019-20 season)

At an interview with local newspaper Expresso, Danny Menken (Eleven's Group Managing Director) referred that Eleven Sports will comprise as a premium package of two 24/7 HD channels (with 4 pop-up channels for overflow coverage) costing less than €10 per month (with discounts for season pass subscribers). The package will be launched on August 15, 2018, the day of the 2018 UEFA Super Cup. On June 29, 2018 it was officially announced that Eleven Sports will have two offerings: a linear offering with two 24/7 channels in HD (with 4 pop-up channels for overflow coverage) and an OTT streaming offer. Both options will cost €9.99.

On December 3, 2019, Eleven Sports announced it would trial an entry into the PPV market in Portugal with the Andy Ruiz Jr. vs. Anthony Joshua II fight. This was the first time a broadcaster engaged in PPV broadcasts after TVCabo (currently NOS) broadcast a select amount of movies between 2005 and 2010 under the "VOD" brand. Current (at the time) Eleven Sports subscribers had access to the event with no extra charge.

Rights

Association football 
  UEFA Champions League
  UEFA Super Cup
  UEFA Youth League
  Jupiler Pro League
  Belgian Super Cup
  Premier League
  Ligue 1 Uber Eats
  Trophée des Champions
  Bundesliga
  2. Bundesliga
  DFB-Pokal
  DFL-Supercup
  LaLiga Santander
  Supercopa

Basketball 
  Liga Endesa
  Copa del Rey de Baloncesto
  Supercopa Endesa

Club content 
  City TV
  LFC TV
  Juventus TV
  Barça TV

Futsal 
  UEFA Futsal Champions League (final four only)

Gridiron football 
 NFL

Kickboxing 
  Enfusion

MMA 
  M-1 Global
  PFL
  Hexagone MMA

Motorsports 
 Formula E
 NASCAR Cup Series

Padel 
World Padel Tour

Tennis 
ATP 250
Laver Cup
WTA Tour

Other 
SFL

See also

 A Bola TV
 Eurosport
 Sport TV

References 

Television stations in Portugal
Sports television networks
Television channels and stations established in 2018